A Nymph by a Stream is an oil painting of 1869–70 by Pierre-Auguste Renoir which is held in the collection of the National Gallery, London. The painting portrays Renoir's 21-year-old model and lover, Lise Tréhot, who featured in over twenty of his paintings during the years 1866 to 1872.

Unusually, the painting is a combination of a classical depiction of a naiad or river nymph reclining by a stream and the recognisable portrait of an actual person.

References

1869 paintings
Portraits by Pierre-Auguste Renoir
Nude art
Portraits of women
Collections of the National Gallery, London